Pipiroa is a rural community in the Hauraki District and Waikato region of New Zealand's North Island. 

The New Zealand Ministry for Culture and Heritage gives a translation of "long pipi" for Pipiroa.

Demographics
The SA1 area is part of the larger Hauraki Plains North statistical area.

Pipiroa had a population of 117 at the 2018 New Zealand census, an increase of 15 people (14.7%) since the 2013 census, and an increase of 18 people (18.2%) since the 2006 census. There were 39 households, comprising 54 males and 63 females, giving a sex ratio of 0.86 males per female. The median age was 40.9 years (compared with 37.4 years nationally), with 27 people (23.1%) aged under 15 years, 18 (15.4%) aged 15 to 29, 45 (38.5%) aged 30 to 64, and 24 (20.5%) aged 65 or older.

Ethnicities were 92.3% European/Pākehā, 12.8% Māori, 5.1% Pacific peoples, 2.6% Asian, and 2.6% other ethnicities. People may identify with more than one ethnicity.

Although some people chose not to answer the census's question about religious affiliation, 61.5% had no religion and 30.8% were Christian. 

Of those at least 15 years old, 6 (6.7%) people had a bachelor's or higher degree, and 18 (20.0%) people had no formal qualifications. The median income was $38,000, compared with $31,800 nationally. 9 people (10.0%) earned over $70,000 compared to 17.2% nationally. The employment status of those at least 15 was that 42 (46.7%) people were employed full-time, 15 (16.7%) were part-time, and 6 (6.7%) were unemployed.

References

Hauraki District
Populated places in Waikato
Populated places around the Firth of Thames